"Cantaloupe Island" is a jazz standard composed by Herbie Hancock and recorded for his 1964 album Empyrean Isles during his early years as one of the members of Miles Davis' 1960s quintet. Hancock later recorded a jazz-funk fusion version of the track, as Cantalope Island, on his 1976 album Secrets.

Musicians 
The musicians for the original 1964 recording were: Hancock (piano), Freddie Hubbard (cornet), Ron Carter (bass) and Tony Williams (drums). The 1976 recording featured Bennie Maupin (saxophone), Wah Wah Watson (guitar), Paul Jackson (bass), and James Levi (drums).

Samples
The jazz rap group Us3 sampled "Cantaloupe Island" in their song "Cantaloop (Flip Fantasia)", from their album Hand On the Torch (1993). "Cantaloop (Flip Fantasia)" was recorded as a demo a year before the group's first release.  but in the US, "Cantaloop (Flip Fantasia)" reached, No. 21 on the R&B Single Sales chart No. 9 on the Billboard Hot 100, becoming the group's only top 40 single.  It did not chart initially in their native UK, but after its US success, it was subsequently re-released in UK where it peaked at No. 23. "Cantaloop" was certified gold by the Recording Industry Association of America (RIAA) on March 25, 1994 for selling over 500,000 copies.

Awards
In 2000, "Cantaloupe Island" placed at #19 in the Jazz24.org "Jazz 100: One Hundred Quintessential Jazz Songs".

References

External links

1960s jazz standards
Modal jazz standards
Hard bop jazz standards
Songs written by Herbie Hancock